Blaž Vrhovec (born 20 February 1992) is a Slovenian professional footballer who plays as a midfielder for Polish club Górnik Zabrze.

Career
Vrhovec made his debut in European competitions for Celje on 5 July 2012, in the UEFA Europa League first preliminary round match against Dacia Chişinău. He scored his first goal in Slovenian top division on 12 August 2012 against Mura 05. On 23 March 2016, he made his debut for the Slovenia national football team against Macedonia. 

In June 2016, Vrhovec signed a three-year contract with Maribor.

On 15 January 2022, after five and a half years with Maribor, Vrhovec signed for the Cypriot First Division side Anorthosis Famagusta until 2024. However, his contract with Anorthosis was terminated on 31 August 2022.

Two days later, on 2 September 2022, he joined Polish Ekstraklasa side Górnik Zabrze on a one-year deal with an extension option.

Career statistics

Club

Honours
Maribor
Slovenian PrvaLiga: 2016–17, 2018–19

References

External links
NZS profile 

1992 births
Living people
Footballers from Ljubljana
Slovenian footballers
Slovenian expatriate footballers
Association football midfielders
Slovenian Second League players
Slovenian PrvaLiga players
Cypriot First Division players
Ekstraklasa players
NK IB 1975 Ljubljana players
NK Celje players
NK Maribor players
Anorthosis Famagusta F.C. players
Górnik Zabrze players
Slovenian expatriate sportspeople in Cyprus
Expatriate footballers in Cyprus
Slovenian expatriate sportspeople in Poland
Expatriate footballers in Poland
Slovenia youth international footballers
Slovenia under-21 international footballers
Slovenia international footballers